Tropaeum is an extinct genus of ammonites found throughout the oceans of the world during the Early Cretaceous.  As with many other members of the family Ancyloceratidae, there was a trend among species within this genus to uncoil somewhat, in a very similar manner to the genus Lytoceras.  The largest species, T. imperator of Australia, had a shell a little over one meter in diameter.

The name "Tropaeum" was applied by paleontologist James De Carle Sowerby, in 1837.

References

External links 
 photograph of the holotype of T. imperator 

Ammonitida genera
Early Cretaceous ammonites
Ammonites of Australia
Ancyloceratoidea